The Wife of Bath is a character in "The Wife of Bath's Tale".

It may also refer to:
 The Wife of Bath (play), a 1713 play by John Gay
 The Wife of Bath: A Biography, a 2023 book by Marion Turner
 Rosa 'Wife of Bath', a rose cultivar